Kingdom of Us is a 2017 documentary film directed by Lucy Cohen and featuring Jamie-Jodie Shanks, Kacie-Kimie Shanks and Lorie-Lanie Shanks.

The film was released by Netflix on October 13, 2017.

Premise 
The documentary follows how the seven children of Paul and Vikie Shanks, four of whom are autistic, are coping with life and handling the traumatic event of their father's 2007 suicide.

Protagonists 
 Jamie-Jodie Shanks
 Kacie-Kimie Shanks
 Lorie-Lanie Shanks
 Mirie-Marie Shanks
 Nikita-Nina Shanks
 Osborn-Oran Shanks
 Pippa-Peita Shanks
 Vikie Shanks

Release 
Kingdom of Us was released on October 13, 2017 on Netflix streaming.

References

External links
 

2017 documentary films
2017 films
Netflix original documentary films
2010s English-language films